ZTF J0139+5245 (also known as J0139 and ZTF J013906.17+524536.89) is a white dwarf star approximately  from Earth in the constellation of Perseus. It is the second white dwarf, after WD 1145+017, to be observed with transits indicative of orbiting planetary material. The star has been found to display deep, irregularly shaped transits suggestive of disrupted planetary debris. Two transits have been observed in the 210-day-long Zwicky Transient Facility (ZTF) light curve of the star, each transit about 25 days long and producing 30−45% dips in brightness. The two transits are about 110 days apart, substantially longer than the short 4.5 hour orbital period seen with WD1145+017. Based on the two observed transits from the Zwicky Transient Facility, the next observable transit was calculated to occur around 15 October 2019. Follow up observations of the star using the Las Cumbres Observatory (LCO) global telescope network were formally requested by the research team.

Stellar characteristics 

The white dwarf has a mass of 0.54 , a temperature of 10,530 ± 140 K and a log (g) of 7.86 ± 0.06.

The apparent magnitude of the star, or how bright it appears from Earth's perspective, is about 18.4. Therefore, it is too dim to be seen with the naked eye.

The star has been found to display deep, irregularly shaped transits suggestive of disrupted planetary debris.

Planetary system 

The supposed planetesimal, ZTF J0139+5245 b, is presumably being ripped apart by the star.

See also 
 Disrupted planet
 List of stars that have unusual dimming periods
WD 1145+017
WD J0914+1914

References

External links 
 ZTF J0139+5245: related images

Perseus (constellation)
White dwarfs